The 23rd Guldbagge Awards ceremony, presented by the Swedish Film Institute, honored the best Swedish films of 1987, and took place on 1 February 1988. Pelle the Conqueror directed by Bille August was presented with the award for Best Film.

Awards
 Best Film: Pelle the Conqueror by Bille August
 Best Director: Kjell Grede for Hip Hip Hurrah!
 Best Actor: Max von Sydow for Pelle the Conqueror
 Best Actress: Lene Brøndum for Hip Hip Hurrah!
 Best Foreign Language Film: Out of Rosenheim by Percy Adlon
 Special Achievement: Bo Jonsson
 The Ingmar Bergman Award:
 Inger Pehrsson
 Ulf Berggren

References

External links
Official website
Guldbaggen on Facebook
Guldbaggen on Twitter
23rd Guldbagge Awards at Internet Movie Database

1988 in Sweden
1987 film awards
Guldbagge Awards ceremonies
February 1988 events in Europe
1980s in Gothenburg
Events in Gothenburg